

California State Volunteer Units 1861 – 1866 
The following are California State Volunteer Units that were active between 1861 – 1866 serving in the Union Army, most west of the Rocky Mountains in place of Federal troops:

California Brigade
In 1861 four infantry regiments were recruited in Pennsylvania by Oregon Senator Edward D. Baker. Though made up of Pennsylvanians they were attributed to California. After the Battle of Ball's Bluff in October 1861 the brigade was renamed Philadelphia Brigade and the regiments were attributed to Pennsylvania as well.

1st California Infantry Regiment - 71st Pennsylvania Infantry Regiment
2nd California Infantry Regiment - 69th Pennsylvania Infantry Regiment
3rd California Infantry Regiment - 72nd Pennsylvania Infantry Regiment
5th California Infantry Regiment - 106th Pennsylvania Infantry Regiment

State militia 
California State Militia units

See also 
California Civil War Confederate Units
Lists of American Civil War Regiments by State
California in the American Civil War

References

Bibliography 
 Dyer, Frederick H. (1959). A Compendium of the War of the Rebellion. New York and London. Thomas Yoseloff, Publisher. .
  The War of the Rebellion: a compilation of the official records of the Union and Confederate armies, Volume 27, Part 1, CHAPTER LXII. Operations on the Pacific Coast, January 1,1861 — June 30, 1862, United States. War Dept.
  The War of the Rebellion: Volume 35, Part 1; CORRESPONDENCE, ORDERS, AND RETURNS RELATING TO OPERATIONS ON THE PACIFIC COAST FROM JULY 1, 1862, TO JUNE 30, 1865. By United States. War Dept, Robert Nicholson Scott, Henry Martyn WASHINGTON: GOVERNMENT PRINTING OFFICE. 1897
  Records of California men in the war of the rebellion 1861 to 1867, California. Adjutant General's Office, SACRAMENTO: State Office, J. D. Young, Supt. State Printing. 1890.

Civil War, Union
 
California
Civil War